Alcohol-Free is a song by South Korean girl group Twice.

Alcohol-free may also refer to:

Alcohol-free zone, zones that disallow the consumption of alcohol
Alcohol-free bar, a type of bar that does not serve alcoholic beverages
Alcohol Free (horse), a racehorse
Non-alcoholic drink, a version of an alcoholic drink made without alcohol
Abstinence from the consumption of alcohol
Teetotalism, the practice or promotion of total personal abstinence from alcoholic beverages
Temperance movement, a social movement against the consumption of alcoholic beverages